Quarles van Ufford  (also: Quarles or Quarles de Quarles, stemming from Quarles) is the name of a Dutch family of English descent whose members have belonged to Dutch nobility since 1815.

History 
The lineage started with William Quarles from Norfolk whose son John is first mentioned in 1524. John Quarles was warden of the broadcloth buyers guild in London in 1570. He was ancestor to the Dutch Quarles lineages.

His grandson Willem Quarles de Quarles (1717–1781), was appointed Baron of the Holy Roman Empire on 14 October 1751. Another grandson, Lodewijk (1719–1781), was ancestor to the lineage of Quarles van Ufford, belonging to the untitled nobility per 1815.
16 September 1815 Pieter Willem Lodewijk Quarles de Quarles (1758–1826) received confirmation of his title of Baron.

Alexandre Quarles van Ufford (1956) and his progeny are members of Dutch nobility since 1992. He is a son of the late Dutch ambassador Bryan Quarles van Ufford (1920–1975) who was married to the late Belgian Jonkvrouw Marie-Emilie van der Linden d'Hooghvorst (1918–1991).

Scions  
 Alexander Johan Quarles de Quarles (1845–1914), Governor of the Celebes Islands
 Carolina Frederika Henriette Quarles van Ufford (1887–1972), honorary citizen of Geldrop
 Cypriaan Gerard Carel Quarles van Ufford (1891–1985), Mayor and Queen's Commissioner
 Hendrik Quarles van Ufford (1822–1860), military officer
 Jacques Jean Quarles van Ufford (1788–1855), Minister of Marine ad int.
 Jan Hendrik Jacob Quarles van Ufford (1855–1917), member of the House of Representatives and of the Council of State of the Netherlands
 Johan Willem Quarles van Ufford (1882–1951), Queen's Commissioner
 Karel Frederik Quarles van Ufford (1880–1942), president of International Federation for Equestrian Sports
 Lili Byvanck-Quarles van Ufford (1907–2002), archaeologist
 Louis Albert Quarles van Ufford (born 1916), Mayor
 Bryan Edward Quarles van Ufford (1920–1975), Diplomat 
 Louis Jacques Quarles van Ufford (1891–1971), member of sports organising committee
 Jonkheer Arnoud Robert Alexander Quarles van Ufford (1920–1979), half-brother of actress Audrey Hepburn
 Jonkheer Ian Edgar Bruce Quarles van Ufford (1924–2010), half-brother of actress Audrey Hepburn
 Maurits Lodewijk Quarles van Ufford (1910–1944), Mayor
 Wilhelm Herman Daniël Quarles van Ufford (born 1929), Mayor and director-general of the Kabinet der Koningin
Jonkheer Pieter Quarles van Ufford (father-in-law of Hugh van Cutsem)
Emilie (Quarles van Ufford) van Cutsem (widow of Hugh van Cutsem), a close friend of the British Royal family.

See also 
 Quarles van Ufford pumping station

References 

 1997, p. 28–29.
Nederland's Adelsboek 90 (2002–2003), p. 162–265.
État présent de la noblesse belge 2011, p. 387–388.

Dutch noble families
Belgian noble families